Acanthocinus nodosus is a species of longhorn beetles of the subfamily Lamiinae. It was described by Johan Christian Fabricius in 1775.

References

Beetles described in 1775
Acanthocinus
Taxa named by Johan Christian Fabricius